Aldon Jacarus Smith (born September 25, 1989) is an American football defensive end who is a free agent. He played college football at Missouri, and was drafted by the San Francisco 49ers seventh overall in the 2011 NFL Draft. Smith also played for the Oakland Raiders and Dallas Cowboys.

Early years
Smith was born in Greenwood, Mississippi. He attended Raytown High School in Raytown, Missouri, where he played for the Raytown Bluejays high school football team. As a senior, he recorded 60 tackles, 21 tackles for loss, 12 sacks, while adding seven forced fumbles, one blocked punt, and a safety on defense, while on offense, he caught 34 passes for 570 yards and four touchdowns as a tight end.

Considered only a three-star recruit by the Rivals.com recruiting network, Smith was considered the No. 5 overall prospect (any position) in the state of Missouri as well as the No. 27 strongside defensive end in the nation. Smith chose Mizzou over Nebraska, Kansas, and Kansas State, among others.

College career
Smith played for the Missouri Tigers football team under head coach Gary Pinkel while attending the University of Missouri from 2008 to 2010.  After being redshirted as a freshman in 2008, he started 11 of 13 games at defensive end in 2009. He finished the season with 60 tackles and 11 sacks. He was named the Big 12 Defensive Freshman of the Year and a first-team freshman All-American. As a sophomore in 2010, he played in nine games, recording 48 tackles and six sacks.

After the season, Smith announced that he would forgo his final two years of eligibility and enter the 2011 NFL Draft.

College awards and honors
 2009 First-team Freshman All-American (College Football News, Phil Steele)
 2009 Big 12 Defensive Newcomer of the Year (Associated Press)
 2009 Big 12 Defensive Freshman of the Year (Coaches)
 2009 Hendricks Award Watch List
 2009 Second-team All-Big 12 (Associated Press)
 2009 Honorable mention All-Big 12 (Coaches)
 2009 Team Defensive Lineman of the Year Award
 2009 Team Freshman of the Year Award

Professional career

2011 NFL Draft
Playing as a defensive end at Missouri, Smith was considered a "DE/OLB prospect" by most NFL scouts and was considered a strong edge run defender as 4–3 end or 3–4 linebacker. Many scouts had compared him to DeMarcus Ware. Prior to the 2011 NFL Draft, he was projected to be selected in the mid-late first round by mock draft analysis. On the day of the Draft, the San Francisco 49ers decided to draft Smith in the first round with the seventh overall pick.

San Francisco 49ers

2011 season
Smith did not start, but did make his NFL debut against the Seattle Seahawks. In Week 4, against the Philadelphia Eagles, he recorded his first sack on Michael Vick. In the next two weeks, Smith would win the Pepsi NFL Rookie of the Week in victories against the Tampa Bay Buccaneers and Detroit Lions. After a strong October, Smith became the first 49ers player since linebacker Patrick Willis in 2007 to earn the NFL Rookie of the Month, he recorded 13 tackles and 6.5 sacks, including one that forced a safety as he helped the 49ers to a 6–1 record. In Week 15, Smith recorded 2.5 sacks against the Pittsburgh Steelers. He also surpassed Charles Haley for the 49ers record for most sacks by a rookie in a single season with 13.0 sacks. He finished with 37 total tackles, four pass deflections, two forced fumbles, and 14 sacks. Smith was half a sack shy of tying the all-time rookie sack record held by defensive end Jevon Kearse despite not starting a single game in his rookie season. He was named Defensive Rookie of the Year by Pro Football Writers of America, and finished second to Von Miller for the Associated Press NFL Defensive Rookie of the Year Award. He was named to the NFL All-Rookie Team.

2012 season
After being used only as a situational pass rusher throughout his rookie year, Smith became a full-time starter in the 2012 season. In the season premiere against the Green Bay Packers, Smith sacked quarterback Aaron Rodgers in a 30–22 victory. In the next game at home against the Detroit Lions, Smith recorded 1.5 sacks as the 49ers won by a score of 27–19. During Week 4, Smith had two sacks as the 49ers shut out the New York Jets 34–0. In Week 11, he recorded 5.5 sacks in a 32–7 blowout win against the Chicago Bears. He earned NFC Defensive Player of the Week for his game against Chicago. The next week, in a game against the New Orleans Saints, he surpassed Reggie White as the fastest player in league history to record his 30th career sack, doing so in 27 games. Smith was named NFC Defensive Player of the Month for November. The next week, against the St. Louis Rams, Smith broke another of White's records by recording 31.5 sacks in his first two seasons. In that same game, he tied Fred Dean's franchise record of 17.5 sacks in one season. On December 16, 2012, Smith recorded his first interception off of Tom Brady in a 41–34 road victory against the New England Patriots. He was named to the Pro Bowl and earned First Team All-Pro honors.

In the 2012 season, Smith recorded 19.5 sacks, 66 tackles, three forced fumbles, a pass deflection, and an interception. Smith broke Cedrick Hardman's 49er's franchise record of 18 sacks in one season, which Hardman set in 1971, in a 14 game NFL season. The 49ers went on to appear in Super Bowl XLVII. In the game, Smith had two combined tackles as the 49ers narrowly lost to the Baltimore Ravens by a score of 34–31.

On the NFL Network's NFL Top 100 Players of 2013 ranking, the players voted him the seventh best player in the league entering the 2013 season, which made him the second highest ever debut and second highest defensive player on the list, both behind J. J. Watt. He was voted the San Francisco 49ers MVP in 2012.

2013 season

Smith got off to a fast start during the 2013 season getting 4.5 sacks in the first three games. However, on September 20, Smith was involved in a single vehicle accident in San Jose, California. He was subsequently arrested on suspicion of driving under the influence and possession of marijuana. After the loss to the Indianapolis Colts in the third week of the football season, he voluntarily entered a rehabilitation facility, to be put onto the non-football injury list with an indefinite leave of absence.

Smith missed five games while in rehabilitation. He returned to the team in Week 10 against the Carolina Panthers, but in a backup role, and did not start a game until Week 13 against the St. Louis Rams. He ended the season strong, finishing with 34 tackles and 8.5 sacks. Despite his limited playing time, Smith was ranked #33 in the NFL Top 100 Players of 2014.

2014 season
Smith served a nine-game suspension for violating the NFL's substance abuse and personal conduct policies. He was reinstated in Week 11.

On August 7, 2015, following an arrest for his third DUI, Smith was released by the 49ers.

Oakland Raiders

2015 season
On September 11, 2015, Smith signed a one-year contract with the Oakland Raiders. He collected two tackles in his first game with the Raiders in the season-opening loss to the Cincinnati Bengals. He got his first start with the Raiders on September 27, against the Cleveland Browns and finished with two solo tackles. The following week, he earned his first sack against the Chicago Bears and finished the game with a season-high six tackles. He played his last game of the season on November 15 against the Minnesota Vikings and finished the 30–14 loss with three tackles and a sack. Two days later, the NFL issued Smith a one-year suspension due to a hit-and-run incident that occurred on August 6, 2015. Smith finished his first season with the Raiders with a total of 28 tackles and 3.5 sacks in seven starts and nine games.

2016 and 2017 seasons
On April 4, 2016, Smith re-signed with the Raiders. On October 27, 2016, Smith applied for reinstatement. However, no reinstatement occurred, resulting in Smith sitting out the entire 2016 and 2017 NFL seasons.

Following an alleged domestic violence incident, the Raiders released Smith on March 5, 2018.

Dallas Cowboys
On March 14, 2020, it was reported Smith was "in the process" of applying for reinstatement from an indefinite league suspension. Smith signed a one-year contract with the Dallas Cowboys on April 2, 2020, after impressing with his conditioning and size (287 pounds). On May 26, 2020, Smith was conditionally reinstated by the NFL and was cleared to take place in the Cowboys' virtual off-season program.

In Week 1 against the Los Angeles Rams on Sunday Night Football, Smith played in a regular season game for the first time since November 15, 2015, tied for a team high 11 tackles (one for loss), had his first sack of the season and two quarterback hits on Jared Goff during the 20–17 loss. In Week 3 against the Seattle Seahawks, Smith sacked Russell Wilson three times, had two tackles for loss, four quarterback hits, and one pass breakup during the 38–31 loss. After posting four sacks in the first three games, his production decreased considerably in the following weeks (tallying only one more sack) and he also was limited with a knee injury. His time on the field was reduced in favor of playing defensive end Randy Gregory. In Week 14 against the Cincinnati Bengals, Smith recovered a fumble lost by running back Trayveon Williams and returned it for a 78-yard touchdown (fifth longest in franchise history) during the 30–7 win, which was Smith's first career touchdown. He finished with 53 tackles (four for loss), five sacks (second on the team), 35 quarterback pressures (second on the team), two passes defensed, and two fumble recoveries.

Seattle Seahawks
On April 15, 2021, Smith signed a one-year contract with the Seattle Seahawks. On August 11, 2021, Smith was released by the team.

NFL career statistics

Regular season

Postseason

NFL records
 Fastest player in league history to record his 30th career sack (27 games)
 Most sacks in a player's first two seasons (33.5)

49ers franchise records
 Most sacks by a rookie in a single season (14.0)
 Most sacks in a single season (19.5)

Legal issues
On January 28, 2012, Smith was arrested for driving under the influence in Miami Beach, Florida.

On June 30, 2012, Smith was believed to have suffered stab wounds when attempting to break up a fight at a party at his Santa Clara county residence. Two other people were shot in the incident.  On October 9, 2013, Smith was charged with "three felony counts of illegal possession of an assault weapon" relating to the stabbing incident. The charges were later reduced to misdemeanors.

On September 20, 2013, Smith was involved in a single-vehicle accident in San Jose, California. He was subsequently arrested on suspicion of driving under the influence and possession of marijuana. After the loss to the Indianapolis Colts in the third week of the football season, he voluntarily entered a rehabilitation facility, to be put onto the non-football injury list with an indefinite leave of absence.

On April 13, 2014, Smith was detained and arrested following an incident at the Los Angeles International Airport in which Smith became belligerent and uncooperative with a TSA agent, who alleged Smith claimed he was carrying a bomb. After interviews revealed that Smith did not clearly state he was carrying a bomb, the Los Angeles City Attorney decided to drop the charges. Smith was suspended for nine games for the 2014 season.

On August 6, 2015, Smith was arrested in Santa Clara, California, for an alleged hit and run after driving under the influence, and vandalism charges. He was released by the 49ers the next day as a result.

On March 9, 2017, Smith was a passenger with a friend driving to Smith's house at 12:00 AM, when the San Francisco Police Department found out both Smith and the driver were under the influence after hitting a police car. Even though Smith was not the driver, both Smith and his friend were detained by the San Francisco Police Department for questioning. The next day, Smith and his friend were released. No arrests were made.

On September 23, 2017, it was announced that Smith had agreed to plead no contest to hit and run in the 2015 incident in exchange for the DUI charges being dropped. He was sentenced to 20 days in jail. During his sentence, he was ordered to attend a treatment facility, and undergo anger management classes. After his release, he was prohibited from entering any bars or other establishments where alcohol is the primary commodity being sold.

On March 3, 2018, someone called the police from Smith's home and reported that he had consumed multiple bottles of tequila and then bit her wrists. Smith reportedly fled the home before police arrived. San Francisco police did not comment on the specifics but did state that domestic violence of a "non-lethal" nature had occurred and they were seeking out Smith for questioning about the incident. On March 23, 2018, Smith was arrested for violation of a court order, where he was ordered to stay away from a woman he assaulted earlier in the month. The woman was revealed to be Smith's fiancee. This picked up from a previous incident that occurred on March 3, where Smith pleaded not guilty on four misdemeanor counts, including domestic violence, assault with force likely to produce great bodily injury, false imprisonment, and vandalism. On April 8, 2018, Smith was arrested for violations in conditions to his bail.

On April 19, 2021, the St. Bernard Parish Sheriff's Office issued an arrest warrant for Smith for second-degree battery. Smith surrendered on April 21, and was released on a $25,000 bond with an arraignment scheduled for July 14.

Smith had further DUI arrests in June 2019 and December 2021.

References

External links

 
 Missouri Tigers bio

1989 births
Living people
American football outside linebackers
American football defensive ends
Dallas Cowboys players
Missouri Tigers football players
Oakland Raiders players
People from Greenwood, Mississippi
People from Raytown, Missouri
Players of American football from Mississippi
Players of American football from Missouri
San Francisco 49ers players
Seattle Seahawks players
Sportspeople from the Kansas City metropolitan area
National Conference Pro Bowl players